The tequila sunrise is a cocktail made of tequila, orange juice, and grenadine syrup. The drink is served unmixed in a tall glass. The modern drink originates from Sausalito, California, in the early 1970s after an earlier iteration created in the 1930s in Phoenix, Arizona. The cocktail is named for its appearance when served—with gradations of color resembling a sunrise.

History
The original tequila sunrise contained tequila, creme de cassis, lime juice, and soda water, and was served at the Arizona Biltmore Hotel where it was created by Gene Sulit in the 1930s or 1940s.
 
The more popular modern version of the cocktail contains tequila, orange juice, and grenadine, and was created by Bobby Lozoff and Billy Rice in the early 1970s while working as young bartenders at the Trident in Sausalito, California north of San Francisco. In 1972, at a private party at the Trident organized by Bill Graham to kick off the Rolling Stones' 1972 tour in America, Mick Jagger had one of the cocktails, liked it, and he and his entourage started drinking them. They later ordered them all across America, even dubbing the tour itself their "cocaine and tequila sunrise tour".

At the time, the Trident was the largest outlet for tequila in the United States, and in 1973 Jose Cuervo picked up on the new drink as a marketing opportunity and put the recipe for the new drink on the back of their bottles of tequila, and promoted it in other ways. Later that same year, the Eagles recorded a song called "Tequila Sunrise" for their Desperado album as the drink was soaring in popularity. In 1988, a successful film titled Tequila Sunrise was released, starring Michelle Pfeiffer, Mel Gibson and Kurt Russell, and directed by Robert Towne.

Preparation and serving
The tequila sunrise is considered a long drink and is usually served in a collins or highball glass. The International Bartender Association has designated this cocktail as an IBA Official Cocktail.

The drink is mixed by pouring in Tequila, ice, then the juice and, lastly, syrup. The signature look of the drink depends on adding the syrup without mixing with the other ingredients. A spoon may be used to guide the syrup down the glass wall to the bottom of the glass with minimal mixing.

Variations

 Aperol sunrise – substitute Aperol orange liqueur for grenadine
 Tequila sunset – substitute blackberry brandy, or dark rum, for grenadine
 Caribbean sunrise – use rum instead of tequila
 Vodka (or Russian) sunrise – use vodka instead of tequila
 Southern sunrise – use Southern Comfort instead of tequila
 Astronaut sunrise – use Tang instead of orange juice
 Amaretto sunrise – use Disaronno amaretto instead of tequila
 Florida sunrise – use equal measures of pineapple and orange juice
 Panama sunrise – use pineapple juice instead of orange juice
 Red Sea sunrise – non-alcoholic version that uses lemonade or Sprite instead of tequila
 Enamorada sunrise – substitute Campari for grenadine syrup
 Colorado sunrise – use Captain Morgan and Sunny Delight instead of tequila and orange juice
 Goon sunrise – use box wine instead of tequila
 Arizona Biltmore tequila sunrise – Hornitos Plata tequila, creme de cassis, fresh lime juice, and club soda

See also

 List of cocktails
Queen Mary (beer cocktail)

Notes

Cocktails with tequila
Citrus cocktails
Three-ingredient cocktails
Sour cocktails
Sweet cocktails